South Fork Swan River is a tributary of the Swan River in Summit County, Colorado. The stream flows northwest from a source near Georgia Pass in the Arapaho National Forest to a confluence with the Middle Fork Swan River that forms the Swan River.

See also
List of rivers of Colorado

References

Rivers of Colorado
Rivers of Summit County, Colorado
Tributaries of the Colorado River in Colorado